The Cotton Club was a nightclub located in North Portland, Oregon. Located at 2125 N. Vancouver Avenue (and N. Tillamook Street), the club gained attention during the 1960s as the "only nightclub on the West Coast with wall-to-wall soul."  Celebrities such as Cab Calloway, Sammy Davis, Jr., Cass Elliot, the Kingston Trio, Joe Louis, and Archie Moore would visit the nightclub when they were in town.

Background 
The Cotton Club, located within the Albina area of North Portland, was a jazz nightclub that rose to fame in the 1960s after being purchased and renovated by Paul Knauls. Paul Knauls moved to Portland, Oregon in 1963 in order to purchase the club.

The jazz club was one of many black owned businesses that occupied the area at the time. It was located in a neighborhood where African-Americans settled after Vanport was destroyed by flooding in 1948 and Interstate 5 and the Memorial Coliseum uprooted a number of black-owned business. By the 1960s, it was part of a thriving area that included the Blue Ribbon Barbecue, Lew's Men's Shop, and the House of Fortune Cafe.

Paul Knauls 
Paul Knauls was born in Huntington, Arkansas in 1931. He joined the Air Force in 1949 just 17 days after graduating from high school, and was the first African-American to be stationed at Fairchild Air Force Base in Spokane, Washington. Knauls worked up to three jobs at a time in order to save up enough money to fulfill his goal of owning a business. In addition to working as a typewriter repairman, he also worked as a dishwasher in a hotel and ski instructor on weekends. Knauls decided to pursue his dream of owning a nightclub in the Portland area due to the city's proximity to the skiing areas at Mt. Hood. He discovered the Cotton Club while visiting the Portland area, and learned the nightclub's owner was willing to sell. After 12 years of saving, Knauls had $17,000, which was enough to begin the process of purchasing a nightclub. After securing a loan of $50,000, Knauls purchased the Cotton Club in 1963. A photo mosaic of Paul Knauls was created for his 90th birthday honoring his life by community people who love, admire and appreciate him

History 
The Cotton Club was named after a famous nightclub located in Harlem, New York. The Cotton Club was initially an unpopular and rundown location under the ownership of a man named Mr. Thompson, who owned the nightclub leading up to 1963 when it was purchased by Paul Knauls.

The Cotton Club was part of the Chitlin' Circuit, which was a network of venues on the West Coast that were safe for African American performers to play their music. Many of the celebrities that came to the Portland area to perform would finish their evening at the Cotton Club. In addition to being a popular spot for celebrities on the Chitlin's Circuit, the club gained traction among white community after being featured in the column “Baker’s Dozen” written by Doug Baker of the Oregon Journal. The club was successful for about seven years until its doors closed in 1970. Notable performers included:
 Sammy Davis Jr. and Cab Calloway
 Duke Ellington
 Mel Brown, who went on to be the drummer for Diana Ross
 Calvin Walker, The Sander's Brothers, Seven Souls, and Sunday's Child were all involved with the cotton club early in their musical careers 
 Ron Steen 
 Renn Woods

See also 

 Jazz in Portland, Oregon
 Music of Oregon

References

African-American cultural history
African-American history in Portland, Oregon
Defunct nightclubs in Portland, Oregon
Eliot, Portland, Oregon
Jazz clubs in Oregon
Jazz in Oregon
North Portland, Oregon